Leslie Weir is a Canadian librarian, one of the founding architects of Scholars Portal and former president of the Canadian Association of Research Libraries. Weir was the University Librarian at the University of Ottawa from 2003 to 2018. She has served as Librarian and Archivist of Canada since August 30, 2019, the first woman to serve in the position, which was created in 2004.

Biography 
Weir was born and raised in Montreal. She earned a Bachelor of Arts in Canadian History from Concordia University in 1976 and a Masters in Library Science from McGill University in 1979.

Weir joined the University of Ottawa in 1992 and was its University Librarian from 2003 to 2018. During her tenure as University Librarian, she founded the School of Information Studies in the Faculty of Arts at the University of Ottawa where she was also a cross-appointed Professor.

Weir was a member of the Board of the Canadian Research Knowledge Network (CRKN), from its inception until 2009 and again from 2011 to 2015. She served as President of Canadiana.org between 2012 and 2016. Weir was also president of the Canadian Association of Research Libraries from 2007 to 2009 and president of the Ontario Library Association in 2017.

Awards 
Weir received the CLA/Ken Haycock Award for Promoting Librarianship in 2015, the Ron MacDonald Distinguished Service Award from the Canadian Research Knowledge Network (CRKN) in 2016, and, in 2018, the Ontario Council of University Libraries Lifetime Achievement Award, and the Canadian Association of Research Libraries award for Distinguished Service to Research Librarianship.

References

Living people
1950 births
McGill University School of Information Studies alumni
Concordia University alumni
Academic staff of the University of Ottawa
Canadian librarians
Canadian women librarians
21st-century Canadian civil servants